Colorado Crimson were an American soccer team that competed in the National Premier Soccer League (NPSL), the fourth tier of the American Soccer Pyramid, for just one season in 2007.

They played their home games at the Broomfield Commons Stadium in the city of Broomfield, Colorado, 19 miles north of downtown Denver.

The Crimson played their inaugural home NPSL match against the Indios USA on May 27, 2007.

Year-by-year

References

External links
 Colorado Crimson

National Premier Soccer League teams
Soccer clubs in Colorado
Broomfield, Colorado
2007 establishments in Colorado
2007 disestablishments in Colorado
Association football clubs established in 2007
Association football clubs disestablished in 2007